Viral V. Acharya (born 1 March 1974) is an Indian economist who was appointed as Deputy Governor of Reserve Bank of India (RBI). He also served as a member of the advisory council of the RBI Academy and was a member of the Academic Council of the National Institute of Securities Markets (NISM), Securities and Exchange Board of India (SEBI) since 2014. As of 23 January 2017, he was appointed to serve a three-year term as a Deputy Governor of the Reserve Bank of India. He resigned from the post in July 2019 with 6 months left for his completion of term.

Biography

Education 
He went to Fellowship High School, Mumbai. Acharya was ranked fifth nationally in 1991 in the Joint Entrance Examination on the basis of which admissions are made to the Indian Institutes of Technology in India. He graduated from the Indian Institute of Technology Bombay in 1995 with a Bachelor of Technology degree in Computer Science and Engineering, receiving the President of India Gold Medal for attaining the highest grade point average in his batch. 

In his final year at IIT Bombay, he enrolled in an elective in international finance. He initially joined the PhD program in computer science at New York University, but after a year switched to the PhD program in finance at New York University Stern School of Business. He graduated in 2001, with his dissertation thesis titled Essays in Banking and Financial Institutions.

Academic career 

After obtaining his PhD, Acharya worked at the London Business School (LBS) from 2001 to 2008. Between 2007 and 2009, he was the Academic Director of the Coller Institute of Private Equity at the LBS. In 2008, he received a Houblon-Norman Senior Fellowship at the Bank of England. Since 2008, he is attached to the New York University Stern School of Business (NYU Stern), where he held the C.V. Starr Professor of Economics chair.

Reserve Bank of India 

On 28 December 2016, Acharya was appointed by the Central Government of India as Deputy Governor of the Reserve Bank of India for a period of three years, starting on 20 January 2017. In June 2019, Viral Acharya quit as RBI Deputy Governor six months before end of his term.

Personal life 
He has composed a music album titled Yaadon Ke Silsile.

Awards
Acharya is a recipient of the Alexandre Lamfalussy Senior Research Fellowship of the Bank for International Settlements for 2017, and the inaugural Banque de France and Toulouse School of Economics Junior Prize in Monetary Economics and Finance in 2011.

Bibliography

Books 
 Viral V. Acharya, Quest for Restoring Financial Stability in India, SAGE Publishing India, July 2020
 Viral V. Acharya, Thorsten Beck, Douglas D Evanoff, George G Kaufman and Richard Portes.  World Scientific Studies in International Economics, 2013
 Viral V. Acharya, Thomas Cooley, Matthew Richardson and Ingo Walter. Dodd-Frank: One Year On. New York University Stern School of Business and CEPR ebook
 Viral V Acharya, Stijn van Nieuwerburgh, Matthew Richardson and Lawrence White. Guaranteed To Fail: Fannie Mae, Freddie Mac and the Debacle of Mortgage Finance. Princeton University Press, March 2011 
 Viral V. Acharya, Thomas Cooley, Matthew Richardson and Ingo Walter, editors. Regulating Wall Street: The Dodd-Frank Act and the New Architecture of Global Finance. John Wiley & Sons, November 2010
 Viral V. Acharya and Matthew Richardson. Restoring Financial Stability: How to Repair a Failed System. John Wiley & Sons, March 2009

See also
 Indians in the New York City metropolitan region

References

External links 
 Viral Acharya's NYU page
 

1974 births
Living people
Indian bankers
21st-century Indian economists
Indian economists
IIT Bombay alumni
New York University alumni